En vän som du was released on 1 April 2009 and is a double compilation album by Swedish band Lasse Stefanz It consists of songs recorded by the band between 1988 and 2008.

Track listing
Ingen väg tillbaka
En tid av stulen lycka
Nyanser
Fyll mitt hjärta med sång
Det är bara du
Lilla fågel flyg
Mitt hjärta sjung
Sjung din sång (Mano)
Skymningsklockor
Solen havet och lyckan
Den gamla grinden
Ännu blommar kärleken
Kärlekens sång (Für den Frieden der Welt)
Mi vida loca
Den tid vi behöver
Om jag säger det är kärlek
En ring på ditt finger (Wrapped Around)
Det kommer en morgon
Ge mig en ros (Buy Me a Rose)
Ett liv med dig
Tomma löften, tomma ord
En vän som du
Du har solen i ditt hjärta
Tänk på mig ibland (Please Remember Me)
Vår kärlek är stark
Röda rosor
Minnen utav kärlek
Det ska blåsa nya vindar (Bahamas)
Bring it on Home to Me
Tio röda rosor
Det är samma blå ögon (The Same Eyes that Always Drove Me Crazy)
Av hela mitt hjärta
Stanna en stund
Dear One
Vi drömde många drömmar (Vi dremte mange dromme)
Vindarnas sång
More than I Can Say
Gula höstlöv
Tre röda rosor
Express retur

Charts

References 

2009 compilation albums
Compilation albums by Swedish artists
Lasse Stefanz albums